Günther Dollinger (born 2 August 1960 in Kempten) is a German physicist and professor at the Bundeswehr University Munich.

Life 
Dollinger completed his doctoral studies in physics at the Technical University of Munich (TUM). He is currently head  of the Institute of Applied Physics and Measurement Technology within the Faculty of Aeronautics and Astronautics at Bundeswehr University Munich. He conducts research in different interdisciplinary and interinstitutional research projects. He is a member of the Munich Centre for Advanced Photonics, an inter-university excellence cluster, funded by the German government, based at University of Munich.

Awards 
For his doctoral dissertation titled Carbon film as a stripper for heavy ions Günther Dollinger was awarded doctoral and postdoctoral price of the Association of Friends of the Technical University of Munich.

Research 
Together with his team at the Institute of Experimental Physics of the TUM in Garching, Günther Dollinger developed a new type of microscopy methods for material analysis. For the first time it allows the three-dimensional analysis of the distribution of hydrogen in microstructured samples.

External links 
 Institute for Applied Physics and Metrology
 Three-dimensional hydrogen microscopy in diamond films, (Faculty of Physics, Technical University of Munich)

References 

1960 births
21st-century German physicists
Living people
Technical University of Munich alumni
Academic staff of Bundeswehr University Munich